(born January 26, 1948) is a Japanese jazz pianist and composer.

Biography
Takase was born in Osaka and started to play piano at age 3. Raised in Tokyo, she studied classical piano at Toho Gakuen School of Music. Starting in 1978, Takase began performing and recording in the US. Her collaborators have included Lester Bowie, Sheila Jordan, David Liebman, and John Zorn. Her first European appearance was in 1981 at the Berlin Jazz Festival in Germany. Through her constant touring and appearances at international jazz festivals, Takase quickly became one of the most sought-after musicians for recording and collaboration.

For many years, she has worked with her husband Alexander von Schlippenbach (also a pianist), as well as with Eugene Chadbourne, Han Bennink, Evan Parker, Paul Lovens, Fred Frith and many others, and in duets with Maria João, Louis Sclavis, David Murray and Rudi Mahall.

In various projects, Takase has dealt with the respective oeuvres of numerous famous jazz musicians, including the works of Duke Ellington (1990), Thelonious Monk (1994), Eric Dolphy (1998), W.C. Handy (2002), Fats Waller (2004), and Ornette Coleman (2006). Given her training and adventurous spirit, Takase's new projects exist as a genre between contemporary music and jazz.  These include her duo project YOKOHAMA (Intakt 2009) with Louis Sclavis, KANON (doubtmusic 2011) with Kazuhisa Uchihashi and Axel Dörner or Hotel Zauberberg with Ayumi Paul in 2014 (Intakt Records).
„LA PLANETE“ w/ Louis Sclavis, Vincent Courtois, Dominique Pifarely. 
“ LOK.03 “ w/ Alex v. Schlippenbach and DJIIIVibe.
„TAMA“ w/ Jan Roder, Oliver Steidle.“ „Reading and Music“ performance w/ Yoko Tawada.
„Cities in the Piano„:dance +piano w / Yui Kawaguchi.„Carmen Rhapsody“ with Mayumi Nakamura.
With her new quintett JAPANIC (26. April 2019/ BMC) Aki Takase brings together HipHop, Jazz and Improvisation.
“ AUGE“ w/ Christian Weber and Michael Griener.

Since 1988, Takase has lived in Berlin.

Discography
An asterisk (*) after the year indicates that it is the year of release.

As leader/co-leader

As sidewoman

Sources:

Awards
 The German Record Critics' Award 1988, 1990, 1993, 1997, 2001, 2004, 2007, 2009, CD "Cherry-Sakura" with David Murray 2017/2. In total she received the awards 9 times (1988–2017).
 Berliner Zeitung Award (the best Artists of 1999 in the Berlin Newspaper)
 The SWR Jazz Award 2002.
 Jazzpreis Berlin, 2018
 German Jazz Preis for Piano/Keyboard Award 2021.
 Albert Mangelsdorff Prize 2021

References

External links
 Official site (in German, English and Japanese)
  Representation

1948 births
Enja Records artists
Japanese expatriates in Germany
Japanese women composers
Japanese jazz composers
Japanese jazz musicians
Japanese jazz pianists
Japanese women pianists
Living people
Women jazz pianists
21st-century pianists
21st-century Japanese women musicians
Musicians from Osaka
Berlin Contemporary Jazz Orchestra members
Leo Records artists
FMP/Free Music Production artists
Intakt Records artists
NoBusiness Records artists
21st-century women pianists
Bellaphon Records artists